Marlena Monika Ng Sta. Maria is a Filipino fashion model. She is known for being a contestant in the third season of Asia's Next Top Model, where she represented the Philippines. Sta. Maria lost the competition to 23 year-old Indonesian model Ayu Gani thus, becoming the runner-up of the competition.

Early life and education
Santa Maria was born to a Filipino mother and a Malaysian father. She was raised in the Philippines from the age of two.  As a child, she never aspired to be a model because she was always shy at school and never imagined herself as a model. Santa Maria graduated with a psychology degree in De La Salle University.  She also became a volleyball player in La Salle where she was part of the team Lady Spikers.

Asia's Next Top Model
Before she appeared in the third season of Asia's Next Top Model, Santa Maria was already featured in various magazines such as Metro, Mega, and Circuit, and won Century Superbod in 2012.  She first auditioned in the second season but was rejected. She finally got in when she auditioned again for the third season of the competition thus, becoming one of the 14 contestants. Sta. Maria is the third runner-up in a row representing the Philippines after Stephanie Retuya and Jodilly Pendre.

2015-present: Post Asia's Next Top Model
After the show, she appeared in various television shows in GMA Network such as Unang Hirit, Taste Buddies, The Ryzza Mae Show, and Fox Sports Philippines The Goat in the Philippines and Glam TV in Malaysia.  She traveled around Asia to promote Subaru as being the Ambassadress. Also, featured as the cover girl of Circuit, Women's Health Malaysia, and Manila Bulletin's Style WEEKEND, and spreads for different Magazines in the Philippines. She's currently the face of Close Up and endorser for Oppo.

In 2016, she competed with Aimee Cheng-Bradshaw on StarWorld's Style and The City. Also, appeared on Asia's Next Top Model 4 for Subaru photoshoot. However, she posed and walked for TRESemme Runway Ready 2016.

In 2017, she signed to Mercator Manila managed by Jonas Gaffud. In May, she appeared in the fifth season of Asia's Next Top Model. She was also featured in a campaign for L'Oreal Paris Philippines and NIVEA Malaysia TVC's. She walked at New York Fashion Week for Manila.

In 2018, she's one of the mentors of the sixth season of Asia's Next Top Model together with her fellow alumnae Shikin Gomez and Minh Tu Nguyen, both from Cycle 5.

References

Living people
Filipino people of Malaysian descent
People from Manila
Tagalog people
Top Model finalists
Filipino women's volleyball players
University Athletic Association of the Philippines volleyball players
De La Salle University alumni
Year of birth missing (living people)